Sigmund Muenz (August 10, 1881 – August 22, 1959) was an American athlete. He competed in the men's standing long jump at the 1908 Summer Olympics.

References

External links
 

1881 births
1959 deaths
Athletes (track and field) at the 1908 Summer Olympics
American male long jumpers
Olympic track and field athletes of the United States
Sportspeople from Darmstadt (region)
People from Wetteraukreis